Traditional music refers to any music reproduced and shared through musical traditions and may equally refer to:
 Art music – implies advanced structural and theoretical considerations or a written musical tradition;
 Classical music – Western take on art music, based on classical musical traditions;
 Folk music, also known as traditional music – oral traditions or musical folklore;
 Traditional folk music – its traditional form
 Religious music – religious musical traditions.

See also  
 List of classical and art music traditions
 List of folk music traditions
 List of Asian folk music traditions
 List of Caribbean folk music traditions
 List of Central American folk music traditions
 List of European folk music traditions
 List of North American folk music traditions
 List of Oceanic and Australian folk music traditions
 List of South American folk music traditions
 Middle Eastern and North African music traditions
 Sub-Saharan African music traditions